Katarzyna Cichopek (born 7 October 1982 in Warsaw, Poland) is a Polish actress.

She is best known to the Polish audience as Kinga Zduńska, starring in the series M jak miłość (L for Love) which is watched by nearly 10 million people. She is the winner of the popular TV show Taniec z Gwiazdami (Polish Dancing with the Stars). She was the host of Jak oni śpiewają? (Polish version of Soapstar Superstar).

Career

1997
Cichopek acted in the serial Boża podszewka as Elżutka.

2000
She was in the serial M jak miłość as Kinga Zduńska.

2004
She took part in the serial Dziki as Zosia Walczakowa.

2005
She was on the Polish Dancing with the stars: Taniec z Gwiazdami.

Cichopek became laureate of the award Viva! Najpiękniejsi.

2006
She became presenter of the festival "TOPTrendy".

2007
She became presenter on popular show Jak Oni Śpiewają? (Soapstar Superstar) and at the festival "TOPTrendy."

In the Eurovision Dance Contest 2007 Kasia Cichopek and Marcin Hakiel were in 4 place.

2008
She married Marcin Hakiel. They have a son Adam (born 2009) and a daughter Helena (born 2013), who in June 2021 performed for the first time on the stage of the Musical Theater „Roma”.

Cichopek was a guest star in TV series Agentki as Anna Migdalska, I kto tu rzadzi? as Iwona, and Daleko od noszy as Joasia.

2009

She took part in the TV series "Tancerze" as Klaudia.

2010 
She made her debut as a theater actress on the stage of the Kamienica Theater in Warsaw.

2013 
She played in the music video for the song "All at once" by Liber and Natalia Szroeder.

Actress 

Boża podszewka (1997) as Elżutka
 (2004) as Zosia Walczakowa
M jak miłość (2000- ) as Kinga Filarska-Zduńska

Dancing with the Stars 

In 2005 Cichopek took part in season 2 of Taniec z Gwiazdami. She danced with Marcin Hakiel and won the season.

On September 4, 2006 she and partner Marcin Hakiel won "Finał Finałów" - finale season 3.

See also

Eurovision Dance Contest
Eurovision Dance Contest 2007

References

External links

Living people
1982 births
Polish film actresses
Dancing with the Stars winners
Actresses from Warsaw
Polish television actresses
20th-century Polish actresses
21st-century Polish actresses
Polish female dancers